Joe or Joseph Mack may refer to:
 Joe Mack (first baseman) (1912–1998), American baseball first baseman
 Joe Mack (catcher) (born 2002), American baseball player
 Joe Mack (Canadian football) (born 1954), former General Manager and Vice-President of Football Operations for the Winnipeg Blue Bombers
 Joe Mack (unionist) (1867–1951), New Zealand railway worker and trade unionist
 Joseph Mack (politician) (1919–2005), member of the Michigan Senate

See also
 Reddy Mack (Joseph McNamara, 1866–1916), Irish-born American baseball player